Summersville is a census-designated place (CDP) and unincorporated community in Green County, Kentucky, United States. As of the 2010 census it had a population of 568.

It has a post office with the ZIP code 42782. Annually in late July the residents host a festival named "Summersville Days".

Summersville was incorporated in 1817.

Demographics

References

External links

Census-designated places in Green County, Kentucky
Unincorporated communities in Kentucky
Census-designated places in Kentucky